John Raus (born August 31, 1984 in Stamford, Connecticut) is a former American soccer player.

Profile

Youth and college
Raus attended Stamford High School and St. Luke's School in New Canaan, Connecticut, played club soccer for the Beachside Premiere club team, and played college soccer at Seton Hall University, where he was a teammate of US national team standout Sacha Kljestan. He was named to BIG EAST Academic All-Star Team as a freshman in 2003.

Professional
After spending a brief period trailing with Major League Soccer side New York Red Bulls, Raus turned professional when he signed with ŁKS Łomża of the Polish Second Division in 2007. While at Łomża Raus scored 5 goals in twenty-two appearances, but left at the end of the season.

He moved to England in 2008, and spent some on trial at League One side, Gillingham., before eventually signing with Conference South side Fisher Athletic in November 2008. He made his debut for Fisher on November 11 against St. Albans City, and scored his first goal on February 18 against Eastleigh.

After Fisher folded at the end of the 2008/09 season, Raus returned home to the United States, and signed with the Tampa Bay Rowdies of the new USSF Division 2 Professional League in April 2010. Raus never played a game for the Rowdies, and moved to Real Maryland Monarchs in the USL Second Division later in the season.

References

External links
 
 
 Fisher Athletic Statistics

1984 births
Living people
American soccer players
American expatriate soccer players
Seton Hall Pirates men's soccer players
ŁKS Łomża players
Fisher Athletic F.C. players
Tampa Bay Rowdies players
Real Maryland F.C. players
Association football wingers
Sportspeople from Stamford, Connecticut
Soccer players from Connecticut
Expatriate footballers in Poland
American expatriate sportspeople in Poland
USL Second Division players
Stamford High School (Stamford, Connecticut) alumni